The Fairbanks Exploration Company Manager's House, also known as The White House and the Sisters' Convent, is a historic house at 757 Illinois Street in Fairbanks, Alaska.  It is a three-story wood-frame structure, five bays wide, with a side gable roof, clapboard siding, and a post-and-beam foundation.  An ell extends from the center of the rear.  The house was built in 1935-36 by the Fairbanks Exploration Company to house its local vice president and general manager.  It is the first Colonial Revival house built in Fairbanks, and is one of the state's finest examples of the style.

The house was listed on the National Register of Historic Places in 1996.

See also
National Register of Historic Places listings in Fairbanks North Star Borough, Alaska

References

1936 establishments in Alaska
Buildings and structures in Fairbanks, Alaska
Colonial Revival architecture in Alaska
Houses completed in 1936
Houses in Fairbanks North Star Borough, Alaska
Houses on the National Register of Historic Places in Alaska
Buildings and structures on the National Register of Historic Places in Fairbanks North Star Borough, Alaska
Historic district contributing properties in Alaska